700 is a year. 700 may also refer to:

 700 BC
 700 (number)
 Lenovo IdeaPad 700, a discontinued brand of notebook computers
 Remington Model 700, a model of rifle
 700 AM

Transportation 

 BMW 700, a model of car
 Tatra 700, a model of car
 Volvo 700 Series, a model of car
 Jawa 700, a model of car+
 Coastliner 700, a bus route in the United Kingdom

See also 

 700 series (disambiguation)
 700 MHz (disambiguation)